Drogheda Lightning was an Irish American Football team based in the town of Drogheda, Co. Louth, Ireland. They played in the second tier of Ireland's American football league system The team played their home games at St. Oliver's Community College in Rathmullen, Drogheda Founded in 2010, Drogheda Lightning competed in the IAFL DV8s Division (now defunct) in 2011 and 2012. Following the restructuring of the Irish American Football League structure ahead of the 2013 season, they competed in the newly created IAFL-1 Division from March 2013.

The team has since been disbanded.

History 
Drogheda Lightning is not the first American Football club to be founded in Drogheda. It supersedes the Drogheda Vikings who were also based in the locality in the 1990s, however the Vikings failed to make it past the turn of the century.

The Foundations for Drogheda Lightning A.F.C. were laid in 2010 when current Head Coach Russell Kerley, a former London Olympians and  Dublin Dragons player expressed an interest in forming an American Football team in the Drogheda area. Local American Football enthusiast James English got in touch with Russell and helped him recruit both players and backroom staff. 
A small but efficient squad of players was assembled in time to enter the 2011 IAFL Development League. The club trained at Dominic's Park, in the Rathmullen area of Drogheda and played its home games at the nearby St. Olivers Community college.

2011 season 

Drogheda Lightning played its first competitive game on 15 May 2011, beating the newly formed Trim Bulldogs 32–6 in Trim.
Drogheda finished the 2011 Season with a respectable 2–3 record the other win coming in a 40-0 victory over the Trim Bulldogs in Drogheda

2011 DV8 Standings

2011 Awards 

Overall MVP - Fu Faapito
Defensive MVP - Declan James Mulvihill
Offensive MVP - David Murray
Coaches Award - Robert Shevlin

2012 season 
Drogheda Lightning Entered the 2012 season with a much larger squad with many new rookies joining the ranks. They once again kicked off their season against division rivals Trim Bulldogs in Trim winning 32–26 in a close run game. Drogheda went on to win another Three games beating Dublin Dragons 2nds twice in Drogheda and defeating Trim Bulldogs once more 31–21 to clinch the DV8s Division at Shorts S & R in Belfast on 19 August.

2012 DV8 Standings

2012 Awards 
MVP - Mick O'Shea (LB)
Offensive MVP - Matty Hagan (WR)
Defensive MVP - Donal Drew (LB)
Rookie MVP - David Lynch (OL)

2013 season 
Coming off the team's triumphant 2012 season in the DV8's, the team stepped up to the new IAFL-1, an 11-per-team league.

The new season started rather favourably with a draw against Tullamore Phoenix and a comprehensive victory against the Mullingar Minotaurs. However, as summertime rolled in, the team began a losing streak that inevitably progressed right until the end of the season, meaning the team finished the season at the bottom of the IAFL-1, tied on points with the Minotaurs.

Lightning Standings 2013

2013 IAFL-1 Standings

2014 season 
The Bolts begin the season With a reshuffling of the quarterback position along with an overhaul of the defense, the team hoped to be a contender in the new IAFL-1 5 team format.

2014 IAFL-1 Standings

2015 season

2015 IAFL-1 Standings

Players

2014 Roster

Rivalries 
The Lightning's traditional rivals are seen to be the Trim based Meath Bulldogs (formerly Trim Bulldogs.) Several key factors allowed for the rivalry between the two sides to grow, including;

 Both teams entering the IAFL at the same time.
 The pre-existing national rivalry between teams from counties Louth and Meath.

Head-to-Head 

To date, Drogheda Lightning and Meath Bulldogs have met nine times with the Lightning holding a 4–5 win–loss record. The first competitive meeting of the teams occurred on 15 May 2011 in Trim from which Drogheda emerging 32-6 victors. The Lightning would go on to do the double over their near neighbours when the teams met in Drogheda just two months later, running out 40-0 victors on this occasion.

In a repeat of their 2012 schedule, Drogheda began their 2012 DV8s campaign with a trip to Trim and came away with a victory; this time by a tighter 32–26 margin. Later in 2012, the sides met again in what has been the only exhibition game between the clubs. Another hard fought tie ensued, from which the Bulldogs picked up their first win against Drogheda on a 28–26 scoreline. Just a month later, the sides met for the third time in the calendar year, the return leg of their DV8s championship season, from which Drogheda once more emerged victorious by a 31–21 margin, clinching the division title in the process.

Coaches

2011–2014 Russell Kerley
2015–         Ross Neville

References 

American football teams
American football teams in the Republic of Ireland
Drogheda
American football teams established in 2010
American football teams disestablished in 2015
2010 establishments in Ireland
2015 disestablishments in Ireland